Granite Pass (el. ) is a mountain pass in the Bighorn Mountains in Wyoming traversed by U.S. Route 14, on the border between Big Horn and Sheridan counties.

References

Landforms of Big Horn County, Wyoming
Mountain passes of Wyoming
Landforms of Sheridan County, Wyoming
Transportation in Big Horn County, Wyoming
Transportation in Sheridan County, Wyoming